Maheshpur Patari  is a village in Laxmipur patari VDC in Siraha District in the Sagarmatha Zone of south-eastern Nepal. Maheshpur Patari Village Development Committees. At the time of the 1991 Nepal census it had a population of 3174 people living in 589 individual households.

References

External links
UN map of the municipalities of  Siraha District

Populated places in Siraha District